Rodman Reservoir, or Lake Ocklawaha, is an artificial reservoir located on the Ocklawaha River in Putnam County and Marion County in north central Florida. It is also a premier largemouth bass fishery for Northeast Florida.

Before the U.S. Army Corps of Engineers created the reservoir, they used a mammoth machine called the crusher-crawler to clear sections of the forest along the Ocklawaha's wooded riverbanks. Upon closing Rodman Dam and flooding the reservoir in 1968, the crushed trees floated up to the top of the reservoir.

The earthen dam and reservoir were the first of a set of two dams and reservoirs that the Corps planned to build along the Ocklawaha River to facilitate navigation along the Cross Florida Barge Canal. However, in 1971, due to the successful efforts of environmentalist Marjorie Harris Carr and Florida Defenders of the Environment (FDE), President Richard Nixon halted construction of the canal. Carr worked until her death in 1997 to preserve and restore the Ocklawaha River.

A four-gate spillway (Kirkpatrick Dam) controls the water levels of the reservoir. The reservoir from its headwaters at Eureka Dam to Paynes Landing consists of flooded woodlands. The transition section from Paynes Landing to Orange Springs consists of flooded standing timber and areas of floating vegetation. The pool section from Orange Springs to Kirkpatrick Dam, including the river channel and the extant Cross Florida Barge Canal, consists of floating and submersed vegetation, dead standing timber and submersed and partially submersed trees and stumps. Submersed vegetation (hydrilla, coontail and eel grass) is common in the pool section of the reservoir. Drawdowns are conducted every three to four years on the reservoir for aquatic plant control and fish and wildlife habitat enhancement.

Rodman Dam was later named the George Kirkpatrick Dam to honor the Florida state senator who was one of the dam's biggest proponents. As of 2014, FDE's campaign for a free-flowing Ocklawaha River is in its fifth decade.

External links 

Lakes of Marion County, Florida
Lakes of Putnam County, Florida
Reservoirs in Florida
Ocala National Forest
Dams in Florida
United States Army Corps of Engineers dams
Dams completed in 1968
Protected areas of Putnam County, Florida
1968 establishments in Florida